Anything Is Possible is the first solo album by Darren Ockert. It was first released physically in the United States and digitally to the rest of the world in 2005 and was nominated for a 2006 Outmusic Award.
Darren was born and raised in Lincoln, England and moved to New York City in 2000 to pursue his musical ambitions.

Product Description
As described by the producer, this album is a unique combination of honest, poetically charged lyrics with American influenced acoustic pop-rock fused with the pulse of British electronic-pop interwoven with lush vocals--think Maroon 5 meets Moby. From the dark mood of the first track "The Limit" to the acoustic guitar-driven "Spread the Love" to the rich multi-layered "A Little Too Comfortable", ANYTHING IS POSSIBLE holds something for every listener.

Track listing
 "The Limit" – 4:02
 "You Were Loved" – 4:15
 "Out Of The Rain" – 4:39
 "Drowning" – 4:29
 "Spread The Love" – 3:33
 "You & I" – 3:53
 "Looking For Something" – 3:53
 "It Isn't Easy" – 4:54
 "Patch Me Up" – 3:56
 "Pie In The Sky" – 3:45
 "A Little Too Comfortable" – 4:57

Reviews
"Sincerity and sexuality in one smooth package. Listen to it with someone you love. Or lust after." -- Gary Stockdale, Emmy Nominated Composer.

"The music industry would do itself a great service by giving this hidden jewel a good, hard Look & Listen." -- Kramer, Rolling Stone Producer Of The Year Kramer, Rolling Stone Producer Of The Year Kramer, Rolling Stone Producer Of The Year

AMAZON Best Sellers Rank
1,869,702 in CDs & Vinyl (See Top 100 in CDs & Vinyl)
1,938 in Funk Rock (CDs & Vinyl)
9,308 in American Alternative Rock
14,141 in Euro Pop (CDs & Vinyl)

External links
Darren official website

2005 albums